This was a new event in the ITF Women's Circuit.

Anett Kontaveit won the inaugural event, defeating Alla Kudryavtseva in the final, 7–6(7–4), 7–6(7–2).

Seeds

Main draw

Finals

Top half

Bottom half

References 
 Main draw

Aegon Eastbourne Trophy - Singles
Aegon Eastbourne Trophy